Gema Sevillano Ordoñez (17 July 1972 – 13 May 2019) was a Spanish Paralympic swimmer and paratriathlete. She was a Spanish triathlon champion in 2012.

References

1972 births
2019 deaths
Sportspeople from L'Hospitalet de Llobregat
Paralympic swimmers of Spain
Paratriathletes of Spain
Swimmers at the 1988 Summer Paralympics
Swimmers at the 1992 Summer Paralympics
Swimmers at the 1996 Summer Paralympics